Môa Nawa is an obsolescent indigenous language spoken in the Brazilian Amazon Basin. It is a Panoan language, and seems to be close to Poyanawa, but classification is difficult due to a near lack of data – it might not be a distinct language at all (Fleck 2013).

References

Indigenous languages of Western Amazonia
Panoan languages